Mbongno (Bungnu), also known as Kamkam, is a Mambiloid language of Nigeria, with an unknown number of speakers in Cameroon.

References

Mambiloid languages
Languages of Nigeria
Languages of Cameroon